Clarence LeRoy Vaughn (September 4, 1911 – March 1, 1937) was a pitcher in Major League Baseball. He played for the Philadelphia Athletics in 1934.

References

External links

1911 births
1937 deaths
Major League Baseball pitchers
Philadelphia Athletics players
Baseball players from Missouri
People from Martinsville, Virginia
Fieldale Towlers players